Name All the Animals  is a 2004 memoir by Alison Smith, detailing the aftermath of the death of her eighteen-year-old brother. While attending Our Lady of Mercy High School, a Catholic high school, Smith developed an eating disorder, lost her faith in God and realized that she was a lesbian, all after her brother's death.

The book has received significant acclaim. It was named one of People Magazine’s ten best books of 2004 and won the Barnes & Noble Discover Award for Non-Fiction, the 2005 Lambda Literary Award for Autobiography/Memoir and the 2005 Judy Grahn Award.

Editions
Hardcover:  
Paperback:

External links
Official Site
Chicago Public Radio show featuring a spoken excerpt

2004 non-fiction books
LGBT literature in the United States
American memoirs
Lambda Literary Award-winning works
LGBT autobiographies
2000s LGBT literature
Lesbian non-fiction books